The Rattlers were an American rock band formed in the New York City in 1979. It was formed by guitarist/vocalist Mickey Leigh, who is the brother of Joey Ramone.

The group released two singles on small independent labels and one album on PVC Records. Their 1979 debut single On the Beach featured Joey Ramone on vocals. The album Rattled! has been widely ignored, although it got good reception. American music journalist Robert Christgau named it as one of his "Top 50 albums of 1985".

Band members 
Mickey Leigh – vocals, guitar, keyboards
David Baillie (musician)|David Baillie – vocals, keyboards
David Merrill – bass guitar
Dave U. Hall – bass guitar
Matty Quick – drums

Discography

Albums 
Rattled! (1985, re-released on CD in 1997)

Singles 
On the Beach / Livin’ Alone (1979)
What Keeps Your Heart Beatin’? / Let's Move (1983)

References 

Garage rock groups from New York (state)
Musical groups established in 1979
Musical groups disestablished in 1988
1979 establishments in New York City